Joseph or Joe Mills may refer to:

Joseph E. Mills, American architect
Joseph Mills (footballer) (born 1989), English footballer
Joseph Trotter Mills, American attorney, jurist, and politician
Joe Mills (rugby union), English rugby union player of late 1800s
Joe Mills (footballer) (1895–1979), English footballer